Zamaana Deewana is a 1995 Hindi-language action comedy film, produced by G. P. Sippy under the Sippy Films banner and directed by Ramesh Sippy. It stars Shahrukh Khan, Raveena Tandon in pivotal roles, along with Jeetendra, Shatrughan Sinha playing their parents, respectively. The music was composed by Nadeem-Shravan. The film performed poorly at the box office.

Plot
Suraj (Shatrughan Sinha) and Lala (Jeetendra) were good friends before falling prey to the vicious tricks of Sundar (Tinnu Anand), so much so that Lala believes his wife is dead and Suraj is to blame for that. They become the greatest of enemies and create chaos in the city by way of gang wars. Asst. Commissioner of Police (Prem Chopra) has 2 criminal psychologists, KD (Anupam Kher) and Shalini (Kiran Juneja) weave a plot to bring Rahul (Shahrukh Khan), the lively and spirited son of Suraj, close to Priya (Raveena Tandon), the ever-so-graceful and elegant daughter of Lala, hoping to bring the two sides together.

Cast
Jeetendra as Madanlal Malhotra, Priya's father.
Shatrughan Sinha as Suraj Pratap Singh, Rahul's father.
Shahrukh Khan as Rahul Singh / Prem Pujari 
Raveena Tandon as Priya Malhotra 
Anupam Kher as Kamdev Singh alias K.D.(Criminal Psychologist)
Prem Chopra as Asst. Commissioner of Police.
Tinnu Anand as Sundar
Kiran Juneja as Shalini Srivastav
Neelima Azeem as Nisha
Beena Banerjee as Sarita Malhotra
Aashif Sheikh as Bobby
Sudhir as Gullu - Hitman
Ghanshyam Rohera as Sai-Landowner

Soundtrack
The music of the film was composed by Nadeem-Shravan, while lyrics were written by Sameer.

Track listing

References

External links

1990s Hindi-language films
1995 films
Films directed by Ramesh Sippy
Films scored by Nadeem–Shravan
Hindi films remade in other languages

Indian romantic drama films
Indian action films